San Francisco Playhouse (formerly SF Playhouse) is a non-profit theater company in San Francisco, California, founded in 2003 by Bill English and Susi Damilano. The theater stages nine plays yearly, including Broadway plays, musicals, and world and regional premieres.

San Francisco Playhouse has been home to several world premieres, including Bauer by Lauren Gunderson, Ideation by Aaron Loeb, Grounded by George Brant, and Seared by Theresa Rebeck.

As part of its mission to shape and promote the growth of performing arts in the Bay Area, San Francisco Playhouse created the Rising Star Program, which provides theatre tickets to under-served youths in San Francisco and surrounding communities.

In 2015, the theater company was awarded the American Theatre Wing's National Theatre Company Grant.

During the COVID-19 pandemic, San Francisco Playhouse became one of the first theatre companies in the United States to get permission from Actors' Equity Association to film live actors on stage. The company's on-demand stream of Art by Yasmina Reza premiered on October 24, 2020, to positive reviews.

History

Change of venue
In 2012, San Francisco Playhouse moved from 533 Sutter Street to a 199-seat theater at 450 Post Street, inside of the Kensington Park Hotel. The building was constructed in 1924 by architect Anthony Heinsberger as a lodge for the Elks. The Elks began leasing out portions of the building in 1981. Their former meeting hall was converted into a 750-seat theater by architect Gene Angell in 1982 for producers Jonathan Reisis and Joseph Perrotti. They presented more than 60 productions in the space as Theatre on the Square. When Theatre on the Square closed down in 2002, the theater served as the home of other groups, including The Post Street Theatre and The Lorraine Hansberry Theatre, before becoming the site of San Francisco Playhouse. During its tenure with The Lorraine Hansberry Theatre, renovations were made including reducing the audience capacity to 400. The San Francisco Playhouse further reduced the seating to 199 prior to their inaugural production in the space in October 2012.

Programs

Rising Star Program
The Rising Star Theatre Attendance Program inspires a new generation of theatregoers by providing Bay Area high school students with a four play season subscription. As part of the TAP, students receive a pre-show lesson plan that includes theatre games/warm-ups, scene teasers and comprehension questions; the post-show lesson provides further enrichment with activities that draw on their experience as audience members.  Rising Stars also participate in an immediate post-show discussion with the cast and director. They then write a letter to their adult subscriber-sponsor describing their reactions to the performances.

The Rising Star Program now serves 600 youth from 19 local high schools. According to the company, Approximately 50% have no formal drama program at their schools, 75% are economically disadvantaged, and 90% are minorities. In a survey conducted by the company, 25% of students reported that they hadn't seen a single play prior to attending a San Francisco Playhouse production, and another 50% had only seen one to two shows before participating in the Rising Star Program.

Sandbox Series
The presentations have limited design elements and are being promoted primarily online thus reducing the costs and risk of each production. By reducing risk, the Sandbox Series is designed to bridge the gap between “readings” and “main stage” productions and thus provide increased exposure to the new voices in American Theater.

Productions

Sandbox Series

References

External links 
 San Francisco Playhouse official website

Theatres in San Francisco
Theatre companies in San Francisco
Union Square, San Francisco